Doru Cristian Andrei (born 3 February 2003) is a Romanian professional footballer who plays as a midfielder for Liga I side FC Voluntari. In his career, Andrei also played for SSU Politehnica Timișoara and Comprest GIM București.

References

External links
 

2003 births
Living people
Sportspeople from Timișoara
Romanian footballers
Romania youth international footballers
Association football midfielders
Liga I players
Liga II players
SSU Politehnica Timișoara players
FC Voluntari players